is a 2010 Japanese animated action-adventure fantasy film based on Masashi Kishimoto's manga and anime series. It was released on July 31, 2010. Along with the film, a comical short feature named  was also shown. The theme song "if" is performed by Kana Nishino. The film was released in North America on September 17, 2013 by Viz Media. The film is set after episode 171.

Plot
Assigned a mission to capture a missing-nin named Mukade, Naruto Uzumaki, Sakura Haruno, Yamato and Sai wield chakra-knives. At the one thousand-year-old desert city ruins of Loran, they confront Mukade attempting to dominate the Ninja World with the power of the Ryūmyaku (the Ley Line in English), an ancient chakra flowing deep underground. He breaks the seal created by Minato Namikaze to unleash the Ryūmyaku's power creating a light that engulfs Naruto and Yamato, before Sai and Sakura ride on an ink bird and attempt to escape.

Naruto and Yamato are sent twenty years into the past. When Naruto awakens from this time slip, he meets the queen of Loran, Sāra. It is later revealed that Mukade traveled to the past six years before Naruto and changed his name to Anrokuzan, the minister of Loran who had killed Sāra's mother Sēramu. Naruto agrees to protect Sāra, after Anrokuzan declares about the kidnapped citizens and creates to summon the "Puppet Ninja Forces". Minato, Shibi Aburame, Chōza Akimichi, and Kakashi Hatake, on their own mission to stop Anrokuzan, appear to support the heroes. 

While they rescue Sara's people and Naruto holds Minato's kunai, Sāra recalls her memory about Sēramu's lullaby. Anrokuzan uses the parts of the tower to become a giant defensive puppet. Minato and Naruto use their regenerative chakra enough to create the legendary Super Rasengan. After Sāra disables Anrokuzan's technique, Minato exposes Anrokuzan's weak spot and Naruto destroys it. As Yamato and Kakashi rescue Naruto and Sāra, Minato uses the kunai to completely seal off the power. Just as the heroes vanish from the past, Minato erases all of their memories to keep history unchanged.

With Mukade/Anrokuzan gone, Sakura and Sai reunite with Naruto and Yamato in the present. As they are about to leave the ruins, they run into Queen Sāra's daughter, who kept the old chakra blade that belonged to Naruto. She informs that it was given to her mother by a "Hero in a Dream". Naruto recognizes his blade, reaches out to his back where he usually keeps his blade, but it is not there, and is left dumbfounded. However, Sakura pinches his ear and accuses him for having a dream.

Cast

Home media
The film was released on DVD on April 27, 2011.

References

External links

 Official Japanese website
 
 Official TV Tokyo website
 

2010 films
2010 anime films
2010s Japanese-language films
Animated films about time travel
Films directed by Masahiko Murata
Japanese sequel films
Lost Tower
Toho animated films
Viz Media anime
Films scored by Yasuharu Takanashi